The 1774 English cricket season was the third in which matches have been awarded retrospective first-class cricket status. The scorecards of five first-class matches have survived.

The Laws of Cricket were revised during the season, the first major revision since the 1744 season. The revision of the Laws introduced leg before wicket as a means of dismissal and formalised the standard width of a cricket bat.

Laws revision
The Laws of Cricket were revised during a meeting held at the Star and Garter on Pall Mall, London during February. This was attended by a range of influential cricket figures who produced "New Articles of the Game of Cricket", essentially a revised version of the 1744 Laws.

The revision introduced Leg Before Wicket (LBW) as a means of dismissal, stating that "the striker is out if he puts his leg before the wicket with a design to stop the ball and actually prevent the ball from hitting it". The introduction of LBW stemmed from batsmen deliberately blocking the ball using their legs rather than attempting to play it with their bat, most notably a player named Ring. While the Law was revised nine times between its introduction and 1831, it was not until 1839 that the Law was amended to state that the ball had to pitch in line with the stumps in order for the batsman to be out.

Matches
Five first-class match scorecards survive from 1774.

22–24 June - Hampshire XI v England - Broadhalfpenny Down
7–8 July - England v Hampshire XI - Sevenoaks Vine
20–21 July - Surrey XI v Hampshire XI - Guildford Bason
8–10 August - Kent XI v Hampshire XI - Sevenoaks Vine
15–18 August - Hampshire XI v Kent XI - Broadhalfpenny Down

In the match between Hampshire and England on 7–8 July, bowler William Bullen took the first known five wicket haul in first-class matches: note that bowlers in this era were only credited with a wicket when they bowled the batsman.

Six other matches are known to have been played during the season, including matches between county teams. Full scorecards do not survive from these matches.

Debutants
The following players made their first known appearance during the 1774 season.

 William Brazier (Kent)
 Richard Miller (Surrey)
 Muggeridge (Surrey)
 Waller (Kent)

References

Further reading
 
 
 
 
 

1774 in English cricket
English cricket seasons in the 18th century